Walter Miles may refer to:
 Walter Richard Miles, American psychologist
 E. Walter Miles, American political scientist and scholar of constitutional law